Sergei Nikolayevich Khabarov (born 16 April 1986) is a Russian professional football official and a former player. He works as a director of sports for FC Chertanovo Moscow.

Club career
He played 4 seasons in the Russian Football National League for 4 different clubs.

External links
 

1986 births
Footballers from Moscow
Living people
Russian footballers
Association football midfielders
FC Dynamo Bryansk players
FC Fakel Voronezh players
FC Tambov players
FC Chertanovo Moscow players
FC Chita players
FC Sportakademklub Moscow players